, in English "incitement to hatred" (used also in the official English translation of the German Criminal Code), "incitement of popular hatred", "incitement of the masses", or "instigation of the people", is a concept in German criminal law that refers to incitement to hatred against segments of the population and refers to calls for violent or arbitrary measures against them, including assaults against the human dignity of others by insulting, maliciously maligning, or defaming segments of the population.

It is often applied to, though not limited to, trials relating to Holocaust denial in Germany.

Constituent elements
Incitement of the People (Volksverhetzung) is defined by § 130 (Incitement to hatred) Section 1 of the Criminal Code:

Section 1

On 21 January 2015, changes to the former text of § 130 Sections 2 and 5, with Section 6 becoming Section 7, took effect following European parliament amendments. At present these changes are not reflected in the English translation of § 130 as updated in the original current German § 130.

Substantiation
Although freedom of speech is mentioned by Article 5 of the Basic Law (Germany's constitution), said article basically protects any non-outlawed speech. "Germany places strict limits on speech and expression when it comes to right-wing extremism" or anything reminiscent of Nazism. Hate speech on the basis of sexual orientation and gender identity also is banned in Germany.

Application to offences committed abroad
Offences contrary to § 130 of the Criminal Code committed abroad, whether by German nationals or foreigners, can be pursued as a domestic crime when they so act as if they had been committed within the country, affecting the public peace in Germany and violating the human dignity of German citizens. It is sufficient, for example, that criminal content on the Internet, for example in the form of a HTML page, can be accessed from Germany. Hence, for example, the jurisdiction of German courts can be applied for offences of sedition committed abroad. Such an example was the conviction of the Holocaust denier Ernst Zündel by the District Court of Mannheim in February 2007, who was convicted of inciting propaganda he had published from the US and Canada on the Internet.

History

Similar laws in other countries

Similar laws exist around the world, for instance:
 In Austria,  is a criminal offense with similar legal elements under section 283 of the Penal Code.
 In the UK, incitement to ethnic or racial hatred is a criminal offense under Sections 17–29 of the Public Order Act 1986.
 In Ireland, the corresponding law is the Prohibition of Incitement to Hatred Act.
 The Finnish criminal code includes a similar law, which calls the crime  ("incitement against ethnic groups") in the Finnish version,  in the Swedish version: 11th chapter ("On War Crimes and Crimes against Humanity"), 8§.
 The Russian Criminal Code such a law called the "incitement of ethnic hatred", which refers to actions aimed at inciting ethnic or racial hatred (Article 282 of the Criminal Code of the Russian Federation). Article 29 of the Constitution states that: Propaganda or campaigning inciting social, racial, national or religious hatred or enmity. The propaganda of social, racial, national, religious or linguistic superiority.

See also 
Incitement to ethnic or racial hatred
Verbotsgesetz 1947

References

Further reading

External links
The German wording of Section 130
English translation
 Translation provided by Prof. Dr Michael Bohlander. Translation completely revised and regularly updated by Ute Reusch

German criminal law
Hate speech
Holocaust denial in Germany